Joe Allen Simpson (born December 31, 1951) is an American former professional baseball player, and has been a radio and television broadcaster for the Atlanta Braves of Major League Baseball (MLB) since 1992.

Career

Playing career
He began his baseball career as an All-American outfielder/first baseman at the University of Oklahoma.

Simpson then played professionally for 11 seasons, beginning in 1973, when he was drafted by the Los Angeles Dodgers in the third round. While with the Dodgers in 1978, he became the 3,000th strikeout victim of Gaylord Perry. He joined the Seattle Mariners in 1979 before being traded to the Kansas City Royals in 1983. An outfielder and first baseman throughout his professional career, he retired from the California Angels organization after the 1984 season.

Broadcasting career
Simpson worked as an analyst on Seattle Mariners telecasts for five years before joining Turner Sports and the Atlanta Braves Radio Network in 1992. He called Atlanta Braves games on TBS and Turner South until broadcasts ended on those networks.

Simpson was named "Georgia Sports Broadcaster of the Year" in 1995.

Simpson was paired with Brian Jordan, Ron Gant and Tom Glavine during broadcasts on Peachtree TV. He was paired with Skip Caray until Caray's death in the summer of 2008.

Simpson served as an analyst for Major League Baseball on TBS coverage of the 2007 MLB Division Series with play-by-play commentator Don Orsillo during the series between the Colorado Rockies and the Philadelphia Phillies. The team called the one-game playoff between the Colorado Rockies and the San Diego Padres. He has served as the color analyst for the coverage of the 2009 National League Division Series between the Philadelphia Phillies and the Colorado Rockies with play-by-play commentator Brian Anderson.

In January 2018, Simpson was inducted into the Braves’ Hall of Fame.

Simpson called Braves games on Fox Sports South and Fox Sports Southeast with play-by-play announcer Chip Caray through the 2018 season. Beginning in 2019, Simpson became the regular color commentator for the Atlanta Braves Radio Network alongside play-by-play announcer Jim Powell. As of 2021, Simpson is usually paired with Ben Ingram.

References

External links
, or Retrosheet, or Pura Pelota
 Atlanta Braves Broadcasters on Atlanta Braves website

1951 births
Living people
Albuquerque Dukes players
American expatriate baseball players in Canada
Atlanta Braves announcers
Bakersfield Dodgers players
Baseball players from Oklahoma
California Angels players
Edmonton Trappers players
Kansas City Royals players
Los Angeles Dodgers players
Major League Baseball first basemen
Major League Baseball outfielders
Oklahoma Sooners baseball players
People from Purcell, Oklahoma
Seattle Mariners announcers
Seattle Mariners players
Tigres de Aragua players
American expatriate baseball players in Venezuela
University of Oklahoma alumni
Waterbury Dodgers players